Louise Marion Bosworth (July 11, 1881 – August 1982) was an American researcher at the Women's Educational and Industrial Union (WEIU) who extensively surveyed working women in order to learn about their working and living conditions. Bosworth helped to blaze the way for more women to do social science research that benefits the public interest.

Selected publications

External links
 
 Louise Marion Bosworth
 Louise Bosworth Papers. Schlesinger Library, Radcliffe Institute, Harvard University.

American women social scientists
American centenarians
1881 births
1982 deaths
Women centenarians